Robert (Bob) Howe (3 August 1925 – 30 November 2004) was an Australian tennis player. His main successes were achieved in the doubles competition. He won four mixed doubles Grand Slam titles, including the Wimbledon mixed doubles championship in 1958.

Grand Slam finals

Doubles (3 runner-ups)

Mixed doubles (4 titles, 4 runner-ups)

References

External links
 
 

1925 births
2004 deaths
Grand Slam (tennis) champions in mixed doubles
Australian male tennis players
Tennis people from New South Wales
Australian Championships (tennis) champions
French Championships (tennis) champions
Wimbledon champions (pre-Open Era)